FAB-9000 (ФАБ-9000) was a very large  conventional high explosive bomb developed early in the Cold War. The bombs were used by the Iraqi Air Force during the Iran-Iraq war, being dropped from Tu-22 Blinder bombers on military, industrial and civilian targets.

See also 
 FAB-5000

References 

Cold War aerial bombs of the Soviet Union
Military equipment introduced in the 1950s